Douglas Albert Russell  (born February 20, 1946) is an American former competitive swimmer, Olympic champion, and former world record-holder in three different events.

Career

Russell was born in New York City, but raised in Midland, Texas.  He began swimming in high school for Midland High School, swimming in the new 50-meter "Alamo" pool built by the city in 1962. It was later renamed in his honor: the "Douglas Russell Swimming Pool."  He was an all-around swimmer in high school—swimming competitively in butterfly, backstroke, and individual medley events.  Other school swimmers of the era remember him as a tough competitor who was hard to beat but who brought out the best in swimmers around him.

He attended The University of Texas at Arlington, where he swam for coach Don Easterling's UT Arlington Mavericks swimming and diving team in National Collegiate Athletic Association (NCAA) competition.  Doug Russell Park, part of the southern edge of the UT Arlington campus, is named in his honor.  At the 1967 Pan American Games, he won a gold medal in the 200-meter individual medley.  He also won an NCAA national championship in the 100-yard butterfly in 1968, and Amateur Athletic Union (AAU) national outdoor title in the 100-meter butterfly.

At the 1968 Summer Olympics, Russell won the first-ever gold medal awarded in the men's 100-meter butterfly—an event which made its debut at the 1968 Olympics–in an upset over teammate and favorite Mark Spitz.  He won another gold medal swimming the butterfly leg for the winning U.S. team in the 4×100-meter medley relay.  Russell, together with relay teammates Charlie Hickcox (backstroke), Don McKenzie (breaststroke), and Ken Walsh (freestyle), set a new world record of 3:54.9 in the event final.

Russell was inducted into the International Swimming Hall of Fame as an "Honor Swimmer" in 1985.  He was the head coach of the Austin Trinity Aquatic Club up until it was disbanded in 2020.

See also

 List of Olympic medalists in swimming (men)
 List of University of Texas at Arlington people
 World record progression 100 metres backstroke
 World record progression 100 metres butterfly
 World record progression 4 × 100 metres medley relay

References

External links
 
 

1946 births
Living people
American male backstroke swimmers
American male butterfly swimmers
American male medley swimmers
College men's swimmers in the United States
World record setters in swimming
Olympic gold medalists for the United States in swimming
People from Midland, Texas
Swimmers at the 1967 Pan American Games
Swimmers at the 1968 Summer Olympics
University of Texas at Arlington alumni
Medalists at the 1968 Summer Olympics
Pan American Games gold medalists for the United States
Pan American Games medalists in swimming
Universiade medalists in swimming
Universiade gold medalists for the United States
Universiade silver medalists for the United States
Medalists at the 1967 Summer Universiade
Medalists at the 1967 Pan American Games
20th-century American people
21st-century American people